Alvin Purple was an Australian television situation comedy series, made by the ABC in 1976. The series followed continued adventures of the title character, previously featured in the successful sex comedy feature film Alvin Purple (1973) and its sequel Alvin Purple Rides Again (1974). It debuted on 19 August 1976.

Graeme Blundell reprised the role of Alvin in the series. Alvin cohabitated with a new character, flatmate Spike (Chris Haywood). As in the films, various women inexplicably lust after Alvin. The women were played by a stream of recognisable Australian actresses in guest-starring roles including Tina Bursill, Jacki Weaver, Belinda Giblin, June Rich, Jane Harders, Pamela Gibbons, Kirrily Nolan, Peta Peita, Judy Lynne, Suzanne Church, Carla Hoogeveen, Chantal Contouri, Anya Saleky. Dawn Lake and Leonard Teale also acted in the series.

Production
In late 1974, Tim Burstall and Hexagon Productions discussed, with ABC, a possible television series based on Alvin Purple. Eventually, ABC made the series in arrangement with Alan Hopgood, who wrote the original screenplay.

During negotiations, apparently neither Burstall nor Alan Finney (of Hexagon) made any claim that they retained rights in Alvin. However, after the ABC had produced several episodes, Burstall and Hexagon became aware that property in the Alvin character belonged to them, and they sued the ABC for breach of copyright.

In the decision Hexagon Pty Ltd and Ors v The Australian Broadcasting Commission [1981] VR 224, the court held that copyright vested in Hexagon, but they were stopped from enforcing its rights by not seeking to do so, before the ABC commenced its production. It was held that the conduct of Hexagon had been such as to indicate to the ABC that they would not pursue any rights and prohibit the ABC from proceeding.

Notes

External links
 

Australian comedy television series
Australian Broadcasting Corporation original programming
1976 Australian television series debuts
1976 Australian television series endings